The 2002 HEW Cyclassics was the seventh edition of the HEW Cyclassics cycle race and was held on 4 August 2002. The race started and finished in Hamburg. The race was won by Johan Museeuw.

General classification

References

2002
2002 in German sport
HEW Cyclassics
2002 in road cycling
August 2002 sports events in Europe